
Taypi Chaka Quta (Aymara taypi center, middle, chaka bridge, quta lake, "middle bridge lake", Hispanicized spellings Taypi Chaca Kkota, Taypi Chaka Kkota) is a lake west of the Cordillera Real of Bolivia located in the La Paz Department, Los Andes Province, Pukarani Municipality, Tuquia Canton, on the border to Batallas Municipality. It is situated at a height of about 4,412 metres (14,475 ft), south west of Sura Quta, a lake connected with Taypi Chaka Quta by the Link'u River ("curve river") that flows down from the Cordillera Real towards Lake Titicaca.

See also 
 Allqa Quta
 Ch'iyar Quta
 Jach'a Jawira
 Juri Quta
 Lawrawani Lake
 Kunturiri
 Surikiña River
 Sura Quta (Patamanta)

References

External links 
 Pukarani Municipality population data and map showing Taypi Chaka Quta situated south west of Sura Quta ("Sora Kota")

Lakes of La Paz Department (Bolivia)